Europe's Biggest Dance Show is an annual multinational dance music simulcast presented by Euroradio and hosted by BBC Radio 1, in collaboration with several European radio stations, all of which are affiliated with Euroradio and owned by public broadcasters which are members of the European Broadcasting Union.

Background
The British Broadcasting Corporation (BBC) announced on 27 September 2019 that it would join radio stations from seven other countries, and a potential audience of 18 million listeners, in hosting a one-off dance music simulcast on 11 October.

The first simulcast began at 19:00 BST and ended at 02:00 BST on 12 October, with Annie Mac introducing for BBC Radio 1 in London. Seven radio stations across Europe joined the simulcast: 1LIVE, Fritz, Mouv', NPO 3FM, RTÉ 2FM, SR P3 and Studio Brussel. Each radio station contributed an hour of dance music from their respective countries, except in the case of 1LIVE and Fritz, who contributed 30 minutes each from Cologne and Berlin respectively. Some stations chose to feature at least one live DJ set as part of their contribution.

Each radio station sent their feeds to Broadcasting House in London, where they were mixed by BBC senior technical producer Dan Morris before being sent back to the radio stations for broadcast.

Despite the simulcast being billed as a one-off event, two subsequent editions of the simulcast were presented in May and October 2020 respectively, before it became an annual event, with new editions presented in the following years and more radio stations joining the simulcast. Since the 2021 edition, each participating radio station, including 1LIVE and Fritz, has contributed 30 minutes of dance music from their respective countries instead of an hour.

Participating broadcasters
The following table lists the countries, broadcasters and radio stations that have participated in Europe's Biggest Dance Show as of 2022.

Editions
The following table lists the editions of Europe's Biggest Dance Show. Countries in bold are countries that made their debut in the simulcast in their respective years.

Notes

References

External links
 

Simulcasts
BBC Radio 1 programmes
British music radio programmes
RTÉ 2fm programmes
Sveriges Radio programmes
2019 radio programme debuts